Raphitoma andrehoaraui is a species of sea snail, a marine gastropod mollusc in the family Raphitomidae.

Description
The length of the shell attains 9.3 mm.

Distribution
This marine species was found off France in the Mediterranean Sea.

References

 Pelorce J. & Horst D. (2020). Raphitoma echinata (Brocchi, 1814) et Raphitoma echinata sensu auctores sur la côte méditerranéenne du département des Alpes-Maritimes (France). Xenophora Taxonomy. 28: 28-35.

andrehoaraui
Gastropods described in 2020